Bradford Lance Costello (born December 24, 1974) is a former American football punter. He played college football at Michigan State and Boston University. Professionally, he played for the Cincinnati Bengals of the National Football League (NFL) and the Scottish Claymores of NFL Europe.

References 

1974 births
Living people
Holy Cross Academy (New Jersey) alumni
People from Moorestown, New Jersey
Players of American football from New Jersey
American football punters
Michigan State Spartans football players
Boston University Terriers football players
Cincinnati Bengals players
Scottish Claymores players
Sportspeople from Burlington County, New Jersey